William T. Haskell (July 21, 1818 – March 12, 1859) was an American politician and a member of the United States House of Representatives for Tennessee's 11th congressional district.

Biography
Haskell was born in Murfreesboro, Tennessee on July 21, 1818. He was privately tutored, he attended the public schools of Murfreesboro, and he attended the University of Nashville in Nashville, Tennessee. He studied law, was admitted to the bar in 1838 and commenced practice in Jackson, Tennessee. He married Sarah Porter, in Henry Co., Tenn., Feb. 7, 1838. They had six children: Shephard P., William C., Joshua, Viola, Anna, and Mary.

Career
Haskell was a soldier in the Seminole War in 1836. During the Mexican–American War, he served as colonel of the 2nd Tennessee Infantry Regiment. He worked as a lawyer in private practice.

In 1840 and 1841, Haskell served in the Tennessee House of Representatives. He was elected as a Whig to the Thirtieth Congress. He served from March 4, 1847 to March 3, 1849.

Death
Haskell died in Hopkinsville, Kentucky, in an insane asylum, March 12, 1859 (age 40 years, 234 days). He was interred in Riverside Cemetery in Jackson, Tennessee. He was the nephew of fellow congressman Charles Ready. His widow was the first woman state librarian of Tennessee, appointed in 1871.

References

External links

1818 births
1859 deaths
Members of the Tennessee House of Representatives
Whig Party members of the United States House of Representatives from Tennessee
19th-century American politicians